A consolidated rental car facility (CRCF) or consolidated rental car center (CONRAC) is a complex that hosts numerous car rental agencies, typically found at airports in the United States.

The most important incentive for building consolidated facilities is greatly reduced traffic congestion in airport pick up and drop off areas.  One fleet of shuttle buses can serve all car rental agencies, instead of each company operating their own buses. Congestion can be further reduced by connecting the consolidated facility to the airport terminal with a people mover.

Consolidated facilities are typically built around two areas: a customer service building where each company operates retail counters to serve renters, and a "ready/return" lot or garage where cars are temporarily parked while ready and awaiting a renter, or when recently returned and in need of servicing before the next renter.

Facilities usually also feature a Quick Turn Around (QTA) area on-site or nearby, where light maintenance of vehicles can be conducted including cleaning, fueling, and inspection of engine fluids. There can be several QTA areas operated by the different companies, or the services can be shared.

The first known consolidated facility was built at Sacramento International Airport in 1994. However, as early as 1974, four companies were already sharing facilities and shuttle buses at Dallas/Fort Worth Airport, and in 1988 companies at Minneapolis–Saint Paul airport introduced common shuttle buses.  These differed from modern CONRACs in that the majority of rental car companies at Dallas/Fort Worth continued to operate their own off-site facilities and shuttle buses, while at Minneapolis, only the shuttle buses and not the facilities themselves were shared (in other words, a single shuttle bus line served multiple off-site rental car companies). 

Furthermore, the rental car industry has seen major mergers, creating three major holding companies that now represent ten brands commonly seen at airports, the Avis Budget Group (which operates Avis Car Rental, Budget Rent a Car, Payless Car Rental and Zipcar), Enterprise Holdings (which operates Enterprise Rent-A-Car, Alamo Rent a Car and National Car Rental) and The Hertz Corporation (which operates Hertz Rent A Car, Dollar Rent A Car and Thrifty Car Rental). Because of these mergers, even in cities without a consolidated facility, many of these companies have consolidated all their brands into one location.

Locations

Facilities under construction 
The LAX Consolidated Rent-A-Car Facility is currently under construction at Los Angeles International Airport. It will be connected to the airport's terminals by an under construction people mover.

The Reno–Tahoe International Airport is currently building a Rental Car and Ground Transportation Center, scheduled to open in 2025.

References 

Airport infrastructure
Car rental